Tannenberg is a municipality in the district of Erzgebirgskreis in Saxony in Germany.

History 
From 1952 to 1990, Tannenberg was part of the Bezirk Karl-Marx-Stadt of East Germany.

References 

Erzgebirgskreis